Lauderdale Lakes, officially the City of Lauderdale Lakes, is a city in Broward County, Florida, United States. As of the 2020 United States Census, the city's population was 35,954. It is part of the Miami–Fort Lauderdale–West Palm Beach Metropolitan Statistical Area, which is home to 5,564,635 people.

History

The city of Lauderdale Lakes was incorporated on June 22, 1961, and was originally popular as a retirement area for Northeasterners, notably New Yorkers who were Jewish. As the White population in Broward County steadily moved westward and its early residents died toward the end of the 20th century, Lauderdale Lakes became a predominantly Caribbean and African American community.

Geography

The city is located in central Broward County. It is bordered by the city of Tamarac on its north, by the city of Lauderhill on its west and south, by the city of Oakland Park on its east, and by the city of Fort Lauderdale on its southeast.

Demographics

2020 census

As of the 2020 United States census, there were 35,954 people, 11,790 households, and 7,456 families residing in the city.

2010 census

As of 2010, there were 15,000 households, out of which 20.7% were vacant. In 2000, 32.1% had children under the age of 18 living with them, 36.7% were married couples living together, 22.2% had a female householder with no husband present, and 36.0% were non-families. 30.1% of all households were made up of individuals, and 16.9% had someone living alone who was 65 years of age or older.  The average household size was 2.59 and the average family size was 3.25.

In 2000, the city the population was spread out, with 27.7% under the age of 18, 8.7% from 18 to 24, 26.9% from 25 to 44, 18.9% from 45 to 64, and 17.9% who were 65 years of age or older.  The median age was 36 years. For every 100 females, there were 81.1 males.  For every 100 females age 18 and over, there were 75.2 males.

As of 2000, the median income for a household in the city was $26,932, and the median income for a family was $32,641. Males had a median income of $26,087 versus $20,434 for females. The per capita income for the city was $14,039.  About 19.9% of families and 22.5% of the population were below the poverty line, including 32.9% of those under age 18 and 16.9% of those age 65 or over.

As of 2000, 71.97% of city residents spoke English as their first language, while 14.48% spoke French Creole, 6.66% spoke Spanish, 4.11% were French speakers, and 0.92% of the population spoke Yiddish.

In 2018, there were 34,321 people. Of this population, 50.5% (17.3k) reported having West Indian ancestry which is the highest in Broward County. 47% (7,697) reported Jamaica as their country of birth while 31.2% (5,115) reported Haiti as their country of birth. 2.1% (343) reported Trinidad and Tobago as their country of birth. 1.6% (254) reported The Bahamas as their country of birth.

As of 2010, Lauderdale Lakes has the second highest percentage of Jamaicans in the US, with 18.80% of the population (the neighborhood of Blue Hills, Connecticut was the only US area that had a higher concentration of Jamaicans, with 23.90% total.) It also had the sixth highest percentage of Haitian residents, with 15.70% of the population.

As of 2018, Lauderdale Lakes still maintains its record of having the second highest percentage of Jamaicans in the US. However, Jamaicans now make up 25.4% of the population. This is also the highest in the state of Florida.

Government 

Until 1998 Lauderdale Lakes was governed by a mayor–council form of government, but elected that year to change to a mayor-commission-manager style of government.  The mayor of Lauderdale Lakes is Hazelle Rogers, who was elected in November 2016.

Media

Lauderdale Lakes is a part of the Miami-Fort Lauderdale-Hollywood media market, which is the twelfth largest radio market and the seventeenth largest television market in the United States. Its primary daily newspapers are the South Florida Sun-Sentinel and The Miami Herald, and their Spanish-language counterparts El Sentinel and El Nuevo Herald.

Economy

At one time Sports Authority had its headquarters in the city.

Education

Broward County Public Schools operates public schools.

Elementary:
Park Lakes Elementary School
Oriole Elementary School
Castle Hill Elementary School (Lauderhill)
Rock Island Elementary School (Fort Lauderdale)

Most residents are zoned to Lauderdale Lakes Middle School. Some are zoned to William Dandy Middle School in Fort Lauderdale and the middle school section of Lauderhill 6-12 School in Lauderhill. All residents are zoned to Boyd Anderson High School in Lauderdale Lakes. In addition residents of the Lauderhill Middle School zone have priority for applying to the Lauderhill 6–12 high school program.

The Roman Catholic Archdiocese of Miami operates area Catholic schools. St. Helen School is in Lauderdale Lakes.

Notable people 

 Glenn Greenwald, journalist
 Eddie Jackson (safety), NFL free agent and safety for the Chicago Bears
 Ryan Shazier, former NFL linebacker and philanthropist

References

External links

 

Cities in Broward County, Florida
Cities in Florida
Caribbean-American culture in Florida